Václav Horák (27 September 1912 – 15 November 2000) was a Czech football player and later football manager.

He was a devoted player of SK Slavia Praha.

Horák played for the Czechoslovakia national team (11 matches/5 goals) and was a participant at the 1938 FIFA World Cup.

References

1912 births
2000 deaths
Czech footballers
Czechoslovak footballers
1938 FIFA World Cup players
SK Slavia Prague players
Czechoslovakia international footballers
Czech football managers
Czechoslovak football managers
FC Baník Ostrava managers
Association football forwards
Sportspeople from Kladno
FC Viktoria Plzeň players
People from the Kingdom of Bohemia